Epichalcia is a genus of snout moths. It was described by Roesler in 1969, and contains the species E. amasiella. It is found in Turkey.

References

Phycitinae
Monotypic moth genera
Endemic fauna of Turkey
Moths of Asia